Jan de Vries (5 January 1944 – 14 January 2021) was a Dutch Grand Prix motorcycle road racer.

Career
In 1971 he became the first Dutchman to win a F.I.M. world championship when he claimed the 50 cc title. In 1973 he won another 50 cc world championship.

He lost the 1972 world championship to Angel Nieto by the narrowest of margins. The two riders ended the season tied with 69 points and three victories apiece. The championship was decided on aggregate times, with Nieto given the title by mere seconds.

Gallery

References

External links

50cc racing page 

Dutch motorcycle racers
50cc World Championship riders
125cc World Championship riders
Sportspeople from Friesland
People from Het Bildt
1944 births
2021 deaths